is a railway station in Kyōtanabe, Kyoto, Japan.

Lines
 West Japan Railway Company (JR West)
 Katamachi Line (Gakkentoshi Line)

Stations next to Ōsumi

History 
Station numbering was introduced in March 2018 with Ōsumi being assigned station number JR-H25.

References

Railway stations in Kyoto Prefecture
Railway stations in Japan opened in 1952